Del Norte Titan is a coast redwood (Sequoia sempervirens) tree in Del Norte County, Northern California, that was confirmed by measuring to be at least  in diameter at breast height (DBH, measured  above soil grade), and  tall. Measured by botanist Stephen Sillett, it ranks as the world's fifth largest coast redwood. One source recognizes it as the largest based on a single-stem measurement. But the source's recognition pre-dates a 2014 discovery in the redwood parks that is larger. Lost Monarch in the same park, is actually larger with more wood volume than Del Norte Titan, if basal stems are included. The fourth largest coastal redwood is in Prairie Creek Redwoods State Park called Iluvatar.

Del Norte Titan was discovered in 1998 along with other giant coast redwoods in the Grove of Titans. The grove (unofficially named) is located in Jedediah Smith Redwoods State Park. The tree is estimated to contain  of wood. Some information about the grove was published by Richard Preston.

Del Norte Titan is part of the Grove of Titans, near other large Coast Redwoods. Their exact location was kept secret by arborists until 2011, when a visitor posted their geolocation online.

See also
 List of individual trees

References

External links
Photographs: Documentation and Information including the 'Lost Monarch' redwood
Orion Article: Day of Discovery - Excerpted from The Wild Trees by Richard Preston

Individual coast redwood trees
Redwood National and State Parks
Natural history of Del Norte County, California